Cumminsville may refer to:
Cumminsville, Kentucky
Cumminsville, Nebraska
Cumminsville, New York

Cincinnati neighborhoods
Northside, Cincinnati, formerly known as Cumminsville
South Cumminsville, Cincinnati